330 Adalberta is a stony asteroid from the inner regions of the asteroid belt, approximately 9.5 kilometers in diameter. It is likely named for either Adalbert Merx or Adalbert Krüger. It was discovered by Max Wolf in 1910. In the 1980s, the asteroid's permanent designation was reassigned from the non-existent object .

Discovery 

Adalberta was discovered on 2 February 1910, by German astronomer Max Wolf at Heidelberg Observatory in southern Germany.

Previously, on 18 March 1892, another body discovered by Max Wolf with the provisional designation  was originally designated , but was subsequently lost and never recovered (also see Lost minor planet). In 1982, it was determined that Wolf erroneously measured two images of stars, not asteroids. As it was a false positive and the body never existed, the name Adalberta and number "330" was then reused for this asteroid, . MPC citation was published on 6 June 1982.

Orbit and classification 

The S-type asteroid orbits the Sun in the inner main-belt at a distance of 1.8–3.1 AU once every 3 years and 11 months (1,416 days). Its orbit has an eccentricity of 0.25 and an inclination of 7° with respect to the ecliptic. Adalbertas observation arc begins with its official discovery observation at Heidelberg in 1910.

Naming 

This minor planet was named in honor of the discoverer's father-in-law, Adalbert Merx (after whom another minor planet 808 Merxia is also named). However it is also possible that it was named for Adalbert Krüger (1832–1896), a German astronomer and editor of the Astronomische Nachrichten, which was one of the first international journals in the field of astronomy. Naming citation was first mentioned in The Names of the Minor Planets by Paul Herget in 1955.

Physical characteristics

Rotation period 

In 2013, a rotational lightcurve of Adalberta was obtained from photometric observations at Los Algarrobos Observatory  in Uruguay. Light-curve analysis gave a well-defined rotation period of  hours with a brightness variation of 0.44 magnitude.

Diameter and albedo 

According to the survey carried out by NASA's Wide-field Infrared Survey Explorer with its subsequent NEOWISE mission, Adalberta measures 9.11 kilometers in diameter, and its surface has an albedo of 0.256, while the Collaborative Asteroid Lightcurve Link assumes a standard albedo for stony asteroids of 0.20 and calculates a diameter of 9.84 kilometers using an absolute magnitude of 12.4.

Notes

References

External links 
 Lightcurve Database Query (LCDB), at www.minorplanet.info
 Dictionary of Minor Planet Names, Google books
 Asteroids and comets rotation curves, CdR – Observatoire de Genève, Raoul Behrend
 Discovery Circumstances: Numbered Minor Planets (1)-(5000) – Minor Planet Center
 
 

000330
Discoveries by Max Wolf
Named minor planets
19100202